Passions Still Aflame is an EP by Clock DVA, released on 26 May 1982 by Polydor Records.

Track listing

Accolades

Personnel 
Adapted from the Passions Still Aflame liner notes.

Clock DVA
 Paul Browse – alto saxophone, tenor saxophone
 John Valentine Carruthers – guitar, bass guitar
 Dean Dennis – bass guitar
 Adi Newton – vocals, trumpet, design
 Nick Sanderson – percussion

Additional musicians
 Shaun Ward – bass guitar (A1, B2)
Production and additional personnel
 Alwyn Clayden – design
 Clock DVA – production, design
 Jamie Fry – cover art
 Tim Thompson – engineering

Release history

References

External links 
 

1982 EPs
Clock DVA albums
Polydor Records EPs